is  the  head coach of the Kagoshima Rebnise basketball team in the Japanese B.League.

Head coaching record

|-
| style="text-align:left;"|Kagoshima Rebnise
| style="text-align:left;"|2017-18
| 42||19||23|||| style="text-align:center;"|6th in B3 |||20||8||12||
| style="text-align:center;"|4th in Final stage
|-
| style="text-align:left;"|Gifu Swoops
| style="text-align:left;"|2018-19
| 20||5||15|||| style="text-align:center;"|Fired |||-||-||-||
| style="text-align:center;"|-
|-

References

1964 births
Living people
Gifu Swoops coaches
Japanese basketball coaches

Kagoshima Rebnise coaches
Nishinomiya Storks coaches
Tokyo Cinq Rêves coaches